Thomas Lote (fl. 1380–1390), of Chippenham, was an English politician.

He may have been related to Thomas Lote, MP for Chippenham in 1363.

He was a Member (MP) of the Parliament of England for Chippenham in 
January 1380, October 1382, February 1383, 1385, September 1388 and January 1390.

References

Year of birth missing
Year of death missing
English MPs January 1380
People from Chippenham
English MPs October 1382
English MPs February 1383
English MPs 1385
English MPs September 1388
English MPs January 1390